Praana is a 2019 Indian Malayalam-language psychological thriller film directed by V. K. Prakash and written by Rajesh Jayaraman. Nithya Menen is the person appearing in the film, who plays an English writer. Resul Pookutty and Amrit Pritam was the sound designers and P. C. Sreeram was the cinematographer. Louis Banks, Arun Vijay, and Ratheesh Vegha provided the music for the film. The film was released on 18 January 2019.

Plot

Based on a series of events in the life of an English writer, Tara Anuradha, who dwells in the horrors of her own fears as she focuses on social issues. The movie also deals with intolerance and injustice that is prevailing in the contemporary society.

Production
Nithya Menen was fluent in Malayalam, Hindi, Kannada and Telugu languages, which helped in shooting the multilingual film. The shooting was done in a hill station in South India. The shooting commenced on 2 October 2018 and was extensively shot in Peerumedu, Kerala.

Music

Louis Banks composed the song "Oru Vaakkin Mounam" sung by Nithya Menen. Arun Vijay composed the original background score and the song "Titliyon Sa" penned by lyricists P. K. Anilkumar in Hindi, Anusha Akasam in Telugu, Harinarayanan B. K. in Malayalam, and Nagarjuna Dixit-HSN Raju in Kannada. Shilpa Raj sung the song in all four languages. She also sang the Sanskrit title song "Praana" composed by Ratheesh Vegha.

Release
The Malayalam version of the film released on 18 January 2019, receiving mixed to positive reviews.

References

External links
 

2019 multilingual films
2019 films
2010s Malayalam-language films
2010s Telugu-language films
2010s Kannada-language films
2010s Hindi-language films
Indian thriller drama films
One-character films
Indian multilingual films
2019 thriller drama films
Films directed by V. K. Prakash